Bob Martin Petcare (usually known as Bob Martin) is a British domestic pet healthcare company.  The company manufactures across two sites in the United Kingdom, and is based in Yatton in North Somerset. The company also has offices in Germany, Italy, France and Spain and two manufacturing sites in South Africa.

History
The company was founded in 1892, originally producing conditioning powders for dogs.  Its main company, Bob Martin (UK) Limited, went into administration on 26 November 2019.  However, the company's operations were able to survive and staff redundancies were avoided following a rescue deal offered by Pets Choice Limited which saw it take on the healthcare factory, assets and goodwill, as well as acquiring a licence for the brand.

Current product range 
The company now markets and produces a wide range of flea, tick and worm products for family pets, pet nutritional supplements, a variety of pet foods, pet cleaning and hygiene products, products to remove pet odours, as well as natural and manufactured snacks and treats. These products are sold in the UK, Europe, and further afield. In 2007, according to Datamonitor, the company was the market leader for pet health care in South Africa.

The company markets products for:
 Dogs
 Cats
 Rabbits
 Guinea pigs
 Other small animals, i.e. hamsters, gerbils, and mice
 Fish
 Caged birds
 Wild birds

References

External links 
http://www.bobmartin.co.uk/ Official Site
Cat Care

Animal food manufacturers
Pet food brands
British companies established in 1892
Companies that have entered administration in the United Kingdom
Manufacturing companies based in Leeds
Manufacturing companies established in 1892
1892 establishments in England